The 2014–15 University of North Dakota men's basketball team represented the University of North Dakota during the 2014–15 NCAA Division I men's basketball season. They were led by ninth year head coach Brian Jones and played their home games at the Betty Engelstad Sioux Center. They were members of the Big Sky Conference. They finished the season 8–22, 4–14 in Big Sky play to finish in a three way tie for tenth place. They failed to qualify for the Big Sky tournament.

Roster

Schedule

|-
!colspan=9 style="background:#009E60; color:#000000;"| Regular season

References

North Dakota Fighting Hawks men's basketball seasons
North Dakota
Fight
Fight